Antonio Narciso (born 1 October 1980) is an Italian professional footballer who plays as a goalkeeper for  club Modena.

Career
After spending his early career as a backup keeper for Bari, with whom he made his Serie A debut on 22 April 2011 against Bologna, and successively as a regular for a number of minor league teams, Narciso joined Modena in 2005 as Giorgio Frezzolini's backup. He then moved on loan to AlbinoLeffe in 2008 to replace  Federico Marchetti, who was loaned to Cagliari, then becoming a first choice for the club.

During the 2010 summer transfer market window he moved to Grosseto.

Narciso was involved in the 2011–12 Italian football match-fixing scandal. On 16 February 2012 he was investigated by the Cremona prosecutor, while on 9 May 2012 he was referred to the Italian Football Federation prosecutor. On 31 May 2012, his plea deal was accepted and he was banned for 1 year and 3 months. 

On 3 September 2013, Narciso joined Foggia on a free transfer.

After playing for Sicula Leonzio in Serie C on loan in the 2017–18 season, he rejoined the club on a permanent basis on 18 July 2018 on a one-year deal. 

For the 2019–20 season, he returned to Modena.

Honours

Club 
Calcio Foggia
 Coppa Italia Serie C: 2015–16

References

External links
 Profile at AlbinoLeffe 
 gazzetta.it
 

1980 births
Living people
People from Trani
Italian footballers
Association football goalkeepers
Serie A players
Serie B players
Serie C players
Serie D players
S.S.C. Bari players
U.S. Triestina Calcio 1918 players
A.S. Gubbio 1910 players
A.S.D. Martina Calcio 1947 players
Modena F.C. players
U.C. AlbinoLeffe players
F.C. Grosseto S.S.D. players
Calcio Foggia 1920 players
S.S. Teramo Calcio players
A.S.D. Sicula Leonzio players
Footballers from Apulia
Sportspeople from the Province of Barletta-Andria-Trani